Cnesteboda spinosa is a species of moth of the family Tortricidae. It is found in Indonesia (Java).

References

Moths described in 1948
Tortricini
Moths of Indonesia